Guillaume Dumont (born 1889, date of death unknown) was a Belgian sculptor. His work was part of the sculpture event in the art competition at the 1928 Summer Olympics.

Career
In 1921 he collaborated with the architect Leon Stynen to create a war memorial column (Herdenkingsmonument 1914–1918) in Knokke to commemorate the fallen of World War I. From a total of 16 designs submitted, Stynen's was the one accepted, and Stynen collaborated with Dumont to make the monument. There is a plaque affixed to the monument on which Dumont's name is misspelled "Dupont". 

The memorial consists of four standing figures representing soldiers leaning against a central column. The sculpture was inaugurated on 11 June 1922.

References

1889 births
Year of death missing
20th-century Belgian sculptors
Belgian sculptors
Olympic competitors in art competitions
People from Borgerhout